John B. Holsclaw Jr. (born May 24, 1963) is an American politician who serves as a member of the Tennessee House of Representatives. Holsclaw is a member of the Republican Party and represents District 4, which includes Unicoi County and parts of Carter County.

Education and career

Holsclaw Jr.graduated from Happy Valley High School in 1982. He received a B.S. degree in engineering from East Tennessee State University.

He is director of engineering for 40 Million Company and owns a jewelry store.

Political career

Holsclaw Jr. has been serving since 2014. The last time he was elected was on November 6, 2018. Holsclaw received 17,651 votes in his last election.

Committees 

Holsclaw Jr. is a chair on the Employee affairs Subcommittee. He is a member on the Commerce Committee, Business Committee, Consumer and Human Resources Committee, an Agriculture and Natural Resources Committee.

Bills sponsored 
In the 111th General Assembly, Holsclaw Jr. sponsored the following bills.

 HB0043 Taxes, Exemption and Credits. Failed
 HB0073 Taxes, Hotel Motel. Passed May 2019
 HB0163 Autopsies.
 HB0164 Traffic Safety. Passed July 2019
 HB0324 Alcoholic Beverages
 Hb0569 Public Defenders
 HB0570 Hotels and Restaurants
 HB0571 Financial Responsibility Law. Passed May 2019
 HB1104 Courts, Administrative Office of the.
 HB1297 Beer
 HB1298 Recreational Areas

Community involvement 

Holsclaw Jr. is a member of the National Rifle Association, the Carter County Republican Party, the Unicoi Kiwanis Club, the Elizabethton and Erwin Chamber of Commerce, and the Carter County Hunting and Fishing Club.

Personal life
He is married to Sheralyn and they have 5 children. He is a member of the Church of Christ.

References

External links
District map

Living people
1963 births
East Tennessee State University alumni
Republican Party members of the Tennessee House of Representatives
21st-century American politicians